Kazakhstan participated in the 2010 Summer Youth Olympics in Singapore.

Medalists

Archery

Girls

Mixed Team

Athletics

Boys
Track and Road Events

Field Events

Girls
Track and Road Events

Boxing

Boys

Canoeing

Boys

Cycling

Cross Country

Time Trial

BMX

Road Race

Overall

 * Received -5 for finishing road race with all three racers

Equestrian

Fencing

Group Stage

Knock-Out Stage

Gymnastics

Artistic Gymnastics

Boys

Girls

Rhythmic Gymnastics 

Individual

Handball

Judo

Individual

Team

Modern pentathlon

Shooting

Rifle

Swimming

Taekwondo

Triathlon

Girls

Men's

Mixed

Weightlifting

Wrestling

Freestyle

Greco-Roman

References

External links
Competitors List: Kazakhstan

2010 in Kazakhstani sport
Nations at the 2010 Summer Youth Olympics
Kazakhstan at the Youth Olympics